The National Advisory Committee on Microbiological Criteria for Foods was established in 1988 to advise the Secretaries of Agriculture and Health and Human Services concerning the development of science-based, microbiological standards by which the safety of foods can be evaluated and by which plant sanitation and processing systems can be improved.

The committee's work also assists the CDC and the Departments of Commerce and Defense. The committee is the outcome of a 1985 report of the National Academy of Sciences Committee on Food Protection, Subcommittee on Microbiological Criteria.

The committee has published reports on a variety of issues related to foods and pathogens, ranging from Salmonella Control Strategies in Poultry to the microbiological safety of sprouted seeds. A full list of reports and recommendations from the committee can be found in the committee's website. 

As of 2020, the committee consists of members with diverse backgrounds and expertise.. Current members as of August 2020 are:

References

External links
 About FSIS, National Advisory Committee on Microbiological Criteria for Foods

United States Department of Health and Human Services
United States Department of Agriculture